Kanifay is a village and municipality in the state of Yap, Federated States of Micronesia.

References
Statoids.com, retrieved December 8, 2010

Municipalities of Yap